Hurbayt is a town in Sharqia Governorate of Egypt.

It's an ancient town referred to in a stele of the 7th century BC, and described by Herodotus, Strabo, and Pliny. 

It served as the capital of the nome of Pharbaethites/Lapt in Lower Egypt.

Etymology 
It was also known as Sheten.

In Ptolemaic and Roman Egypt it was known as Pharbaithos or Pharbaethus. This name is reproduced under the form Karbeuthos in George of Cyprus.

Ecclesiastical history
The original diocese was a suffragan of Leontopolis, in Augustamnica Secunda, Egypt.

There is a record of Bishop Arbetion at Nicæa in 325, and Bishop Theodorus in 1086, but it is possible that the latter was bishop of another Pharbætus situated further to the west, and which according to Vansleb was equally a Coptic see. John of Nikiu relates that under the Emperor Phocas (602-10) the clerics of the province killed the Greek governor Theophilus.

It remains a Roman Catholic titular see under the name Pharbaetus.

See also
 List of ancient Egyptian towns and cities

References

Sources
 

Attribution
 The entry cites:
 Heinrich Gelzer, Georgii Cyprii Descriptio orbis romani, 114-16;
 ROUGÉ, Géographie ancienne de la Basse Egypte (Paris, 1891), 66-74; 
 Émile Amélineau, La Géographie de l'Egypte à l' époque copte (Paris, 1893), 330.
Populated places in Sharqia Governorate
Catholic titular sees in Africa
Cities in ancient Egypt
Nile Delta